Camp Hill (also, formerly, "Wind Mill Hill") is a small hill on the Halifax Peninsula, Nova Scotia. Historically, much of the hill was part of the Halifax Common, and is today home to a number of public institutions. The topography of the area has been greatly altered over time, with the construction of large hospital and high school buildings. The Camp Hill area is roughly enclosed within two city blocks; the Camp Hill Cemetery, and the block bounded by Robie Street, Summer Street, Bell Road, and Veterans Memorial Lane (originally the eastern terminus of Jubilee Road, renamed in 1999).

Landmarks

Present
 QEII Health Sciences Centre, Infirmary site (originally Camp Hill Medical Centre)
 Abbie J. Lane Memorial Building
 Camp Hill Veterans' Memorial Building
 Halifax Infirmary
 Emergency & Trauma Centre
 CBC Television Halifax studios
 Camp Hill Cemetery
 Common Roots Urban Farm

Historical
 Reservoir 
 Camp Hill Hospital
 Queen Elizabeth High School (demolished In 2011)

References

Communities in Halifax, Nova Scotia